The 1998 San Marino Grand Prix was a Formula One motor race held at Imola on 26 April 1998. The 62-lap race was the fourth round of the 1998 FIA Formula One World Championship and was won by David Coulthard driving a McLaren-Mercedes.

Race summary
It was back to business for McLaren in qualifying, with Coulthard outpacing Häkkinen for pole, and Ferrari's Schumacher and Eddie Irvine keeping things neat by qualifying third and fourth. However, the men in red had hoped for better, and had followed Tyrrell's lead in fitting 'side-wings' - x-shaped wings bolted atop the sideboards. But these appendages did not produce enough of a gain to topple the McLarens and, with Jordan, Sauber and Prost also sprouting these peculiar side-wings the sport's governing body voted to ban them the day after the race, as they felt that they would be unsafe if a driver suffered a side-on impact.

The race was simplicity itself for Coulthard as he controlled proceedings ahead of Mika Häkkinen, with Schumacher split from Irvine by Jacques Villeneuve's Williams. But on lap 17 Häkkinen retired to the pits, and the garage door was immediately rolled down to conceal his problem. It later proved to be a gearbox failure.

Unaware of his teammate's problem, Coulthard motored on ahead of Schumacher until the German emerged from his second stop and started to fly, eating into the Scot's 20-second advantage at a rate of a second per lap. Debris in a sidepod had sent Coulthard's oil cooler temperature soaring, and team boss Ron Dennis kept sprinting from the pit wall to the McLaren garage to check on the telemetry, so that Coulthard could be instructed how much he could afford to ease off to save his engine. Therefore, the Scot could every so often match Schumacher's pace, and he duly recorded the win. Irvine sent the Ferrari fans home happy by taking the final podium place, with the Williams duo of Villeneuve and Frentzen the only other unlapped runners.

Classification

Qualifying

Race

Championship standings after the race

Drivers' Championship standings

Constructors' Championship standings

 Note: Only the top five positions are included for both sets of standings.

References

San Marino Grand Prix
San Marino Grand Prix
San Marino Grand Prix
San Marino Grand Prix